This is a list of municipalities in Nicaragua which have standing links to local communities in other countries. In most cases, the association, especially when formalised by local government, is known as "town twinning" (usually in Europe) or "sister cities" (usually in the rest of the world).

A
Altagracia

 Bainbridge Island, United States
 Herne, Germany

B
Bluefields

 A Estrada, Spain
 Girona, Spain
 Montevideo, Uruguay

C
Camoapa

 Arcata, United States
 Sant Just Desvern, Spain

Cárdenas
 Malgrat de Mar, Spain

Chichigalpa
 Wels, Austria

Chinandega

 Appleton, United States
 Eindhoven, Netherlands
 Leverkusen, Germany
 Molins de Rei, Spain

Ciudad Antigua

 Algaida, Spain
 Amurrio, Spain
 Bera, Spain

Ciudad Darío

 L'Alcúdia, Spain
 Lommel, Belgium
 Villanueva de Castellón, Spain

Condega

 Ansfelden, Austria
 Banyoles, Spain
 Bend, United States
 Löhne, Germany

Corinto

 Bremen, Germany
 Cologne, Germany

E
Estelí

 Bielefeld, Germany
 Delft, Netherlands
 Sant Feliu de Llobregat, Spain
 Sheffield, England, United Kingdom
 Stavanger, Norway

G
Granada

 Badajoz, Spain
 Dos Hermanas, Spain
 Frankfurt am Main, Germany
 Santa Tecla, El Salvador
 Terrassa, Spain

J
Jalapa

 Boulder, United States
 Champigny-sur-Marne, France
 Dison, Belgium
 Santa Coloma de Gramenet, Spain
 Vista Hermosa, Mexico

El Jícaro
 Yellow Springs, United States

Jinotega

 Cornellà de Llobregat, Spain
 Solingen, Germany

Jinotepe
 Santa Cruz, United States

Juigalpa

 Ann Arbor, United States
 Leiden, Netherlands

L
Larreynaga

 Columbia County, United States
 Pittsfield, United States
 Rhinebeck, United States

León

 Alicante, Spain
 Berkeley, United States
 Gettysburg, United States
 Hamburg, Germany
 León, Mexico
 Londrina, Brazil
 Lund, Sweden
 New Haven, United States
 Oxford, England, United Kingdom
 Salzburg, Austria

 Zaragoza, Spain

La Libertad
 Doetinchem, Netherlands

M
Managua

 Hialeah, United States
 L'Hospitalet de Llobregat, Spain
 Madrid, Spain
 Puebla, Mexico
 Quito, Ecuador
 Rio de Janeiro, Brazil
 São Bernardo do Campo, Brazil
 Sukhumi, Georgia
 Taipei, Taiwan
 Yekaterinburg, Russia

Masaya

 Belo Horizonte, Brazil
 Cartago, Costa Rica
 Dietzenbach, Germany
 Leicester, England, United Kingdom
 Nijmegen, Netherlands

Matagalpa

 Gainesville, United States
 Lewisham, England, United Kingdom
 Sabadell, Spain
 Tilburg, Netherlands
 Wuppertal, Germany

Matiguás
 Saarlouis, Germany

Moyogalpa

 Bainbridge Island, United States
 Herne, Germany

N
Nagarote
 Norwalk, United States

Nueva Guinea

 Hernani, Spain
 Sint-Truiden, Belgium

O
Ocotal

 Alingsås, Sweden
 La Courneuve, France
 Hartford, United States
 Rubí, Spain
 Santa Fe, Spain
 Swindon, England, United Kingdom
 Wiesbaden, Germany

P
La Paz Centro

 Amherst, United States
 Montcada i Reixac, Spain

Posoltega
 Bloomington, United States

Puerto Cabezas

 Burlington, United States
 Luleå, Sweden
 Sant Pere de Ribes, Spain
 Vilafranca del Penedès, Spain

Puerto Morazán
 Bristol, England, United Kingdom

Q
Quezalguaque
 Brookline, United States

Quilalí

 Salt, Spain
 South Haven, United States

R
El Rama
 Maastricht, Netherlands

El Realejo
 Cologne, Germany

Rivas

 Belén, Costa Rica
 Offenbach am Main, Germany

S
San Carlos

 Albacete, Spain
 Badalona, Spain
 Bologna, Italy
 Erlangen, Germany
 Groningen, Netherlands
 Linz, Austria
 Nuremberg, Germany
 Witten, Germany

San Francisco Libre
 Reading, England, United Kingdom

San Isidro
 Pittsburgh, United States

San José de Bocay
 Blacksburg, United States

San José de los Remates
 Cortona, Italy

San Juan de Cinco Pinos
 Mollet del Vallès, Spain

San Juan de Oriente
 Sacramento, United States

San Juan del Sur

 Giessen, Germany
 Newton, United States
 Torroella de Montgrí, Spain

San Marcos

 Biel/Bienne, Switzerland
 Helmond, Netherlands
 Jena, Germany

San Miguelito

 Sant Boi de Llobregat, Spain
 Waltrop, Germany

San Pedro de Lóvago
 Gennep, Netherlands

San Rafael del Norte
 San Rafael, United States

San Rafael del Sur
 Friedrichshain-Kreuzberg (Berlin), Germany

Santa Teresa
 Richland Center, United States

Santo Tomás

 Mol, Belgium
 Thurston County, United States

Somotillo

 Bennington, United States
 Sant Fost de Campsentelles, Spain

Somoto

 Fougères, France
 Lasarte-Oria, Spain
 Laudio/Llodio, Spain
 Leganés, Spain
 Merced, United States

T
Telpaneca
 Inca, Spain

Ticuantepe
 Mairena del Aljarafe, Spain

La Trinidad

 Delémont, Switzerland
 Moers, Germany

V
El Viejo
 Norwich, England, United Kingdom

Villa El Carmen
 Moscow, United States

Villanueva
 Montornès del Vallès, Spain

W
Waslala
 Dorsten, Germany

Wiwilí de Jinotega
 Freiburg im Breisgau, Germany

References

Nicaragua
Populated places in Nicaragua
Foreign relations of Nicaragua
Nicaragua geography-related lists